Sutilizona tunnicliffae is a species of sea snail, a marine gastropod mollusk in the family Sutilizonidae.

Description

Distribution

References

Sutilizonidae
Gastropods described in 2001